Kyleakin (Scottish Gaelic: Caol Àcain) is a village situated on the east coast of the Isle of Skye in the Inner Hebrides, Scotland. The village is along the strait of Kyle Akin opposite the northwest Scottish mainland town of Kyle of Lochalsh. Kyleakin is within the parish of Strath.

History
The etymology of Kyleakin is disputed. The most popular account is that the name is derived from 'Strait of Haakon' named after the King Haakon IV of Norway whose fleet moored there prior to the Battle of Largs in 1263 which ended Norwegian rule of the island. Another possible origin from Acunn, a Celtic mythological hero.

In the early 19th century, Lord Macdonald conceived a grandiose plan for the development of Kyleakin, to be re-christened "New Liverpool". A contemporary print, intended to illustrate his plans, shows row upon row of tenement buildings but the project never came to fruition.

The village of Kyleakin is also the site of Castle Moil, an ruined fortress built in the late 15th century. Legend states that there were much older fortifications on the site, and that it was originally built for a Norwegian princess known as 'Saucy Mary' who would charge a toll to any boat using the narrow channel by hanging a chain from the castle to the mainland to prevent unpaid crossings. Her remains are said to be buried on the top of Beinn na Caillich (Gaelic for "mountain of the old woman"), the large mountain to the rear of the castle ruins. However, some local historians contest this and claim that she was laid to rest by another mountain of the same name a few miles west in the village of Broadford, so that she may forever face the land of her birth.

Transport
From 1841 to 16 October 1995 a ferry service operated from Kyleakin to the mainland across the narrow strait of Loch Alsh, until it was replaced by the controversial Skye Bridge. Initially a toll bridge, the tolls were discontinued in 2004 following protests by local people.

Sport
Kyleakin plays host to Kyleakin Football Club, who won the Skye and Lochalsh Bagshaw league in 2009, goalkeeper Lennie Chiffers is also part of an accomplished bowls team in the village.  It also hosts a new year football match between bachelors and married men. It is also a breeding ground for shinty players, including John "Slippy" Finlayson, who won the Camanachd Cup with Skye Camanachd in 1990 and Steven Morrison, Scotland Under-21 Captain.  Kyleakin Primary School are also the only primary school age team to have ever won the Mod Cup in 2001.

See also
Caisteal Maol

References

External links

Kyleakin village website

Populated places in the Isle of Skye